is a railway station on the Asa Line in Yasuda, Aki District, Kōchi Prefecture, Japan. It is operated by the third-sector Tosa Kuroshio Railway with the station number "GN23".

Lines

Layout
The station consists of a side platform serving a single elevated track. There is no station building but a shelter with both an enclosed and an open compartment has been set up on the platform. Access to the platform is by means of a flight of steps or an elevator.

Adjacent stations

Station mascot
Each station on the Asa Line features a cartoon mascot character designed by Takashi Yanase, a local cartoonist from Kōchi Prefecture. The mascot for Yasuda Station is a boy wearing a hat with a fish on it. Named , the character is chosen because the nearby Yasudagawa river is known for its Ayu fish.

History

Passenger statistics
In fiscal 2011, the station was used by an average of 119 passengers daily.

See also 
List of railway stations in Japan

References

Railway stations in Kōchi Prefecture
Railway stations in Japan opened in 2002